Parasiopelus is a genus of beetles in the family Carabidae, containing the following species:

 Parasiopelus ornatus (Peringuey, 1892)
 Parasiopelus somalicus (Basilewsky, 1957)

References

Harpalinae